Trechus hodeberti is a species of ground beetle in the subfamily Trechinae. It was described by Deuve in 1998.

References

hodeberti
Beetles described in 1998